Caesium bisulfate or cesium hydrogen sulfate is an inorganic compound with the formula CsHSO4. The caesium salt of bisulfate, it is a colorless solid obtained by combining Cs2SO4 and H2SO4.

Properties
Above 141 °C, CsHSO4 is a superionic conductor. The rapid ionic conductivity arise especially in the range of these temperatures due to the high activity of protons.

Based on the results of X-ray crystallography, the structure consists of tetrahedral sulfate centers that bridge caesium ions.  The proton is associated with the oxygen on sulfate.

CsHSO4 goes through three crystalline phases that are referred to as phase III, II, and I. CsHSO4 is initially existing in phase III at a room temperature of 21 °C. Phase III ranges from 21 °C to 90 °C with a transition temperature of 90 °C to 100 °C between phase III and phase II. Phase II ranges from 90 °C to 140 °C. At 140 °C, CsHSO4 undergoes a phase shift from phase II to phase I.

Phase III (21 °C to 90 °C) and Phase II (90 °C to 140 °C) are referred to as the monoclinic phases, in which CsHSO4 exhibits its lowest proton conductivity. As the crystalline structure’s temperature is raised, it will show variations in the unit cell volume and the arrangement of its hydrogen bonds, which will alter the ability of a CsHSO4 crystalline structure to allow the displacement of protons.

At 141 °C, the CsHSO4 crystal structure experiences a structural change from monoclinic phase II to a tetragonal phase, becoming phase I. Phase I has more elevated crystal symmetry and widened lattice dimensions. Phase I is noted as the superprotonic phase (strong conducting phase), which triggers an extreme growth in proton conductivity by four orders of magnitude, reaching 10 mS/cm. This makes the conductivity of CsHSO4 ten-fold stronger than the conductivity of a sodium chloride aqueous solution. In the superprotonic phase, the movement of an SO4 tetrahedron generates a disruption of the hydrogen bond network, which accelerates proton transfer. The tetragonal anions available in the structure are accountable for the arrangement of the hydrogen bonds with the moving protons.

Potential applications
The maximum conductivity of pure CsHSO4 is 10 mS/cm, which is too low for practical applications. In composites with SiO2, TiO2, and Al2O3), the proton conductivity below the phase transition temperature is enhanced by a few orders of magnitude.

Unlike hydrated protonic conductors, the absence of water in CsHSO4 provides thermal and electrochemical stability. Electromotive force (EMF) measurements in a humidified oxygen concentration cell verified the high ionic nature of CsHSO4 in its superprotonic phase. Based on heat rotation, the voltage stayed the same for over 85 hours during the measurement, particularly at the high temperature. These results, demonstrate the thermal independence from humidity-type environments. Additionally, the crystal structure of CsHSO4 allows for quick transport of smaller charged ions, resulting in efficient energy transfer in electrochemical devices.

References

Caesium compounds